The Indonesian Choice Award for Song of the Year is an honor presented at the Indonesian Choice Awards, a ceremony that was established in 2014 and originally of trophy called the Golden Thumb Awards. Awards in several categories are distributed annually by the NET. to "honor artistic achievement, without regard to album sales or chart position." Raisa has been nominated three times and is the most winner artist for twice. This is a following list of winners and nominees:

Winners and nominees

References

Indonesian Choice Awards